Dead Planet is the third studio album by former Queens of the Stone Age and Kyuss bassist/vocalist Nick Oliveri and his band, Mondo Generator. The album was recorded in late 2005 and early 2006 at Dave Grohl's Studio 606 and at Donner & Blitzen studios. The album features Oliveri on bass, vocals, guitars and drums, Hoss Wright on drums, and Ben Perrier, Ben Thomas and Marc Diamond among others.

The album was originally released on the UK label Mother Tongue Records and Impedance Records of Australia in 2006, under the name Dead Planet: SonicSlowMotionTrails. Suburban Noize Records released the album on July 17, 2007 in the United States under the title Dead Planet with a different track list order, plus the remaining tracks from III The EP attached at the end.

In 2020, Dead Planet was reissued as a repress by Oliveri's current label Heavy Psych Sounds Records, featuring new cover art of Oliveri and a similar track listing to the original release.

Track listings

Notes
 "All the Way Down", "There She Goes Again", "Bloody Hammer" and "Sleep the Lie Away" are all from Mondo Generator's previous EP III the EP.
 "So High" is a new recording of "So High, So Low" from Mondo Generator's previous album A Drug Problem That Never Existed.
 "Mental Hell" is a cover of a Ramones song from their album Animal Boy.
 "All the Way Down" was originally recorded by one of Oliveri's old bands, River City Rapists.
 Track 13 is a new recording of "Paper Thin" from Nick Oliveri's solo acoustic album Demolition Day.
 "Bloody Hammer" is a Roky Erickson cover.
 "SonicSlowMotionTrails" was abbreviated to "S.S.M.T." on the Dead Planet rerelease.

Personnel
Mondo Generator
Nick Oliveri – bass, lead vocals
Ian Flannon Taylor – guitar, backing vocals
Simon "Spudd" Beggs – guitar
Ernie Longoria – drums

Additional musicians
Ben Perrier
Ben Thomas
Marc Diamond
Blag Dahlia
Mathias Schneeberger
Harley Spider
Dave Catching
Molly Mcguire
Hoss Wright
Alfredo Hernandez

Production
Nick Raskulinecz

References

External links
 Official Site
 Official Myspace
 Suburban Noize Records

2007 albums
Mondo Generator albums
Suburban Noize Records albums
Albums produced by Nick Raskulinecz